Bananes mécaniques is a 1973 French erotic comedy directed by Jean-François Davy.

Plot
When summer comes, five young, pretty and penniless women decide to squat at the villa of one of their fathers who's gone for holidays. The girls just want to have fun and the place could looks like heaven for a man who would join in,

Cast
 Marie-Georges Pascal: Marie-Georges
 Anne Libert: Anne, the starlet
 Pauline Larrieu: Pauline
 Elisabeth Drancourt: Elisabeth
 Marie-Claire Davy: Marie-Claire
 Philippe Gasté: François
 Patrice Pascal: the young woodcutter
 Patrice Valota: Marc
 Christine Laurent: Juliette (uncredited)
 Antoine Marin: the mayor of the village
 Paul Pavel: the grocer of the village
 Pierre Forget: Pauline's father
 Jacques Robiolles: the hippie
 Christel Micha: young mistress of Pauline's father (uncredited)
 Jean-François Davy: Babette's friend (uncredited)

References

External links

Bananes mécaniques at Encyclo-ciné (French)
Pictures of Bananes mécaniques at imcdb.org

1973 films
1970s French-language films
1970s sex comedy films
French sex comedy films
1973 comedy films
1970s French films